Cape May Inlet (formerly Cold Spring Inlet) is an inlet in southeastern Cape May County, New Jersey.

Geography
The United States Coast Guard Training Center Cape May is located on the southwest shore of Cape May Inlet.

It was described in 1834 as,

Cold Spring Inlet was described in 1878, viz.,

History
Cold Spring Inlet appears on maps as early as 1700, and as "Cold Spring" the inlet is labeled on a map published in 1749 by Lewis Evans.
Cold Spring Inlet had been named for the local community of Cold Spring, and its eponymous spring. In time, it became associated with the City of Cape May after the city became the center of development in the area. With the creation of Cape May Harbor, the inlet was considered a part of that body of water, but began to be referred to locally as "Cape May Inlet". On April 9, 1987 the United States Board on Geographic Names approved the naming of the inlet as "Cape May Inlet".

See also 
Two Mile Beach
Poverty Beach

References 

Inlets of New Jersey
Bodies of water of Cape May County, New Jersey